Generalgouvernement is a German term that may refer to:
General Government of Belgium under German occupation during World War I
General Government of Warsaw under German occupation during World War I
General Government in German-occupied Poland during World War II